This article lists the complete results of the group stage of the 2010 Uber Cup in Kuala Lumpur, Malaysia.

Group A

China vs. United States

Malaysia vs. United States

China vs. Malaysia

Group B

Indonesia vs. Australia

Denmark vs. Australia

Indonesia vs. Denmark

Group C

Japan vs. Germany

Russia vs. Germany

Japan vs. Russia

Group D

Korea vs. South Africa

India vs. South Africa

Korea vs. India

References

Uber Cup group stage